Yerkesh Shakeyev is a Kazakh composer, lyricist and songwriter whose work ranged from bard songs and pop hits to neoclassicism. He was born on May 5, 1962 in the village of Ruzaevka, Kokchetav Oblast, into the family of Kokena Shakeev, the People's Akyn of Kazakhstan and the First President of the Akyns Union of Kazakhstan.

Shakeyev has collected international recognition in the music industry. He placed on the 3rd place at the South Pacific International Song Contest in Australia in 1999, holds special awards of the British Academy of Composers and Songwriters (BASCA), won Platinum "Tarlan Prize" and the All-Union television festival "Song of the Year" (Moscow, Russia).

Shakeyev started his professional career in 1987 after winning the Republican contest of young talents called "Zhastar Dausy" (1st place and the audience award). After this, he was invited to work as a singer-songwriter to the ensemble of Aray directed by Taskyn Okapova.

Shakeyev's songs were released in dozens of albums by well-known Kazakhstan and Russian artists, such as A – Studio (in three formulations), Batyrkhan Shukenov, Ani Lorak, Anita Tsoi, the duo Myuzikola,duo of "duo L, group Vostok (East) 'Nagima Eskalieva, group  "Rakhat Lukum", Parviz Nazarov, Rahat Turlyhanov, Tolkyn Zabirova, Baurzhan Isayev, Dinara Sultan, Group of 101, and many other stars of the post-soviet union area.

Personal life 
Yerkesh Shakeyev is married to Zhibek Dusanovna Shakeyeva; they have four children. In 2015 they celebrated 25 years of marriage. On July 28, after being missing for two weeks, his son Safar's body was found in the Esentai river, in Almaty. The reasons for his death are still being investigated.

Career 
 Began a collaboration with the group  A – Studio'  since 1989. The first songs, written as a poet, together with a group, had become hits ( "Stop, noch'! (Stop, Night)" "Belaya reka (White River)", " Soldat lyubvi (Soldier of Love)", "Sezon dozhdey (Rainy Season)", "Eti teplyye letniye dni (These warm summer days)", and so on. D.) . The peak of his joint work with this group was the song "Nelyubimaya (Unloved)" (music and lyrics by E. Shakeyev), with which he won the All-Union TV Festival "Song-95", and even after for many years these song continued winning various charts throughout the CIS (Commonwealth of Independent States).
 In 1991, the Christmas meetings of Alla Pugacheva ended with the song on the verses of Y. Shakeev "Ostrov Nadezhdy (Island of Hope)" performed by Russian pop stars (A. Pugacheva, Vladimir Presnyakov, S. Chelobanov, Shukenov B. et al.)
 Since 1995, he has worked with Duo L  ( "Donna osen' (Donna autumn)", "Love story", "Alma-Ata"), with duo  'Myuzikkola''' as a songwriter ( " Devochka v plat'itse belom (Girl in a white dress)"," Rozovyy rassvet (Pink sunrise)"," Proshchay (Goodbye)"," Ya ne luna (I am not a moon)".
 In 1996 he recorded the song in his performance ""Nikomu tebya ya ne otdam" (I won't give you to someone)" and also he had released his own album "Kan'on lyubvi (Canyon of love)."
 In 1997 he wrote the famous song "Krestnaya mat' (Godmother)" for Parviz Nazarov ( "Mercy", "Ty Daleko (You're Away)"). He came up with album for Tolkyn Zabirova ( "Sygray, maestro, tango (Just play, maestro the tango)", "Yeliseyskiye polya (Champs Elysees)", "Ardagym").
 In 1998 he wrote the lyrics for Vladimir Stupin and produced his participation at the International Competition "Asia Dausy" (1st place) and the International competition of performers in Pamukale, Turkey (2nd place).
 In 2000 he began working with Rakhat Turlykhanov ( "Zimniye livni (Winter rains)", "Zvezdnyye nochi (Starry Nights)", "Asyl azhe", "Daylight between us" – in collaboration with the English poet Barney Pini and producer Guy Fletcher ).
 In 2001, I started cooperation with Nurlan Bimurzinym ( "Ona ne takaya (she is not like...)", "Ya tebya lyublyu (Ilove you)", "Ne rasstavaysya (Do not brake)").
 In 2002, created the project Dayana (Diana) ( "Gloria", "Anda Sand", "Priletay (arrive)"), began to write songs for a solo project of Batyrkhan Shukenov ( "Tvoi shagi (Your Steps)", "Revnivaya (Jealous)", "Vremya lyubvi (Love Time)", "Polzhizni (Half of life )"," Kto (Who) ","20 minut do rassveta (20 minutes before the sunrise)","Ya tebya risuyu (I'm drawing you").
 In 2003 he released the album of most popular songs of Y.Shakeyev called "Vysota (Height)".
 In 2006 he wrote the song called  "Martovskiy vecher (March evening)" on poems by Alexander Belyaev, performed by Lima Vajkule this song became the laureate of the TV project Novyye Pesni o Glavnom (New songs about the main) on RTR TV channel in Moscow.
 In 2007 he received an honored diploma at the TV Festival "Pesnya Goda 2007 (Song of the Year 2007)" (Moscow) for the lyrics to the song "Begu k tebe (Run to You)" performed by the group   A-Studio.
 In 2008, the song "Serdtse pod pritselom (The Heart under the gun)" performed by Group 101 became very popular song. In celebration of the 10th anniversary of Astana city, the song "Gorod nad rekoy (City on the River!)", Performed by the Uzbek ensemble Yalla (music by Farukh Zakirov, words E. Shakeyev), was recognised as the best song about Astana.
 In 2009, the CIS radio stations made popular the song "Dusha (Soul)" (music and lyrics by Y. Shakeeva and E., B. Serkebayev).
 In 2010 in Moscow was release of two albums of Batyrkhan Shukenov and one album of "A-studio" ( "Volny (Wave)"), with music and lyrics Y. Shakeyev. In the same year in the CIS the song  "Fashion girl" was broadcast, music and lyrics of the song by Y. Shakeyev, performed by the group A- Studio, song became the winner of the TV festival "Pesnya Goda 2010 (Song of the Year 2010)" in Moscow.
 In 2011, the grand closing event for the country, "Asian Games 2010" was held under the song Y. Shakeyev "Asian Games Kazakhstan".
 Since 2012 Yerkesh started cooperation with Anita Tsoi, Ani Lorak, lime Vajkule, Zhuldyz.
 On the 20th anniversary of the Republic of Kazakhstan, Y. Shakeyev wrote the song "My Motherland" (co-author of the text Kairat Saparbayev, by Batyrkhan Shukenov Erkesh Shakeeva, Nurlan Abdullin, Andrew Tregubenko and Aikyn), which till this days broadcast on TV channels of the country and in 2015 the same composition was performed at the Assembly of People of Kazakhstan.
 From October 1, 2012 the CIS has begun rotation of the clip on the Y. Shakeyev's song " Zazhigay serdtse (Light up the Heart)" performed by Ani Lorak.
 In the summer of 2013 the song "Zazhigay serdtse (Light up the Heart)" performed by Ani Lorak won the Russian TV channel RU.TV Music Award in the category "Best Dvizhuha (best action)".
 September 27, 2013 in Kiev hosted a presentation of the new album of Ani Lorak, which was called "Zazhigay serdtse (Light up the Heart)."
 October 26, 2013 Kazakhstani singer Zhuldyz had presented her new album "Ot serdtsa (From the Heart)"  the album was proceed in the style of  Classical Crossover ''. All eleven songs were written Yerkesh Shakeyev.
 December 7, 2013 at concert hall Olympic in Moscow, Yerkesh Shakeyev became the winner of the annual TV festival "Pesnya Goda (Song of the Year)" with the song "Zazhigay serdtse (Light up the Heart)" performed by Ani Lorak.
 From January 2014 he began a collaboration with well-known musician and conductor Marat Bisengaliyev, and began to work on the new projects in the genre neoclassicism.
 In the period from 12 May to July 10, 2014, in London's world-famous studios "AIR studios" and "Abbey Road" the new album "Inception" was recorded, the album was consisting entirely of works by Y. Shakeyev. Recording took place with the participation of the legendary London Symphony Orchestra.
 December 6, 2014, Yerkesh Shakeyev once again became the winner of the famous Russian TV festival "Song of the Year" for the music and lyrics to the song " Dusha (Soul)" performed by the group A-Studio.
 January 17, 2015 in London (United Kingdom), in the concert hall of St. Luke's, for the first time in the history of Kazakhstan and the CIS countries, was held a unique online concert with musical works Yerkesh Shakeyev performed by the famous London Symphony Orchestra and virtuoso solo violinist Marat Bisengaliyev with the participation of world-renowned conductor Lior Shambadala (chief conductor of the Berlin Symphony Orchestra).
 February 5, 2015 in Mumbai (India), at the Opera House Jamshed Bhabha Theatre, and on February 8 at the largest arts festival Mumbayskom Kala Ghoda Open Air, music Yerkesh Shakeyev was performed by Symphony Orchestra of India (SOI) and Marat Bisengaliev (solo violin). The music of Kazakh composer was heard by more than ten thousand people.
 April 18, 2015 was held a solo concert of Yerkesh Shakeyev "Pesni pod Gitaru (songs with a guitar)," where he performed original songs. Also during the concert there the State Symphony Orchestra "Camerata of Kazakhstan" under the control of Gauhar Murzabekova (conductor Paul Tarasevich) performed five works of Yerkesh in the genre of neoclassic.
 In March 2016, Yerkesh recorded 12 pieces with the famous British pianist, John Lenehan. Recording of the album took place in Abbey Road Studio and was produced by Jonatan Allen (BAFTA Winner). The album is called: "Celestial" and was released through CDbaby distributor along internet platforms like Spotify and Apple music in 2017.
 In September 2016, Yerkesh recorded 17 compositions for the cello and piano. The famous British cellist Alexander Baillie and the pianist John Lenehan took part in recording these pieces. The sound producer was Chris Craker (nominee for The Grammy Awards). The album was produced by Yerkesh's son - Safar, who tragically died on 16 July 2016 in the age of 24. Safar was a young and ambitious filmmaker who graduated from the famous American University "Chapman".
 In January 2017, Yerkesh recorded 18 compositions with the London Metropolitan Orchestra and the "London Voices" choir. The sound producer was Winner of The Grammy Awards - Steve McLaughlin, conducted by Andy Brown.
 In May 2017, at Abbey Road Studios, Yerkesh recorded 10 more pieces with the Royal Philharmonic Orchestra. This recording was conducted by Richard Balcombe (UK). The sound producer was Chris Cracker.
 On 2 June 2018, there was a presentation of Yerkesh's album called: "Waves From Heaven". This album was performed by the Royal Philharmonic Orchestra at Cadogan Hall (London) and was conducted by David Firman (UK). This album has received a lot of praise from music critics around the world. 
 Album "Waves from Heaven" was originally recorded at Abbey Road and Air Studios in London and performed by LSO, RPO, LMO orchestras. Mastering made one of the best specialists in the world, the owner of four Gramophone Awards and the nominee of two Grammy-winning Andrew Walter at Abbey Road Studios. 
 Also this music was performed by the famous British violinist, Winner of Brit Awards - Chloe Hanslip and the famous Croatian pianist Maxim Mrvica, who also included a piece of "Remember Me" in his new album "The New Silk Road".

Awards 
 Tarlan" Yerkesh was awarded by the Platinum Tarlan Award in 2003 for the creativity.
 September 3, 2012, Yerkesh was awarded by the title of honorary citizen of Kokshetau.
 December 5, 2012, Yerkesh was awarded by the honorary title "Honored Person of Kazakhstan".

Quotes 
 While singing Yerkesh Shakeyev's "Nelubimaya (Unloved)," Batyr, in gratitude to the audience, who were singing it along with musicians knelt and sentimentality pressed his hands to his face.

References

External links 
 https://www.youtube.com/watch?v=QwxoL-lddL8&list=RDQwxoL-lddL8&start_radio=1
 http://www.musicweb-international.com/classrev/2018/Jul/Shakeyev_heaven.htm
 https://www.elegantclassics.cz/l/shakeyev/
 https://thelondonpost.net/meeting-yerkesh-shakeyev-composer-kazakhstan/
 http://www.johnlenehan.co.uk/news/the-music-of-yerkesh-shakeyev
 http://itunes.apple.com/album/id/1404731837
 https://open.spotify.com/album/6Q7hjFBUIgSXWQuOSNPKem
 Yerkesh Shakeyev. Ne khochu byt' mashinoy, pishushchey muzyku (interv'yu na sayte www.caravan.kz)
 Yerkesh Shakeyev. Kak dostayetsya schast'ye (interv'yu na sayte www.kazakh.ru)
 Yerkesh Shakeyev. Soldat svoyey lyubvi (interv'yu na sayte www.time.kz)
 Yerkesh Shakeyev. Na lyudey smotryu, kak na bol'shikh detey (interv'yu na muzykal'nom portale KZMZ)
 Yerkesh Shakeyev. Moya istoriya (video-interv'yu v proyekte "Moya Istoriya" na Sed'mom kanale)
 Yerkesh Shakeyev. YA vse delayu po veleniyu serdtsa (interv'yu na sayte www.erkindik.kz)
 Yerkesh Shakeyev's official site.

1962 births
Living people
Kazakhstani composers
Male composers